The Symphony No. 6 in F major, Op. 68, also known as the Pastoral Symphony (German: Pastorale), is a symphony composed by Ludwig van Beethoven and completed in 1808. One of Beethoven's few works containing explicitly programmatic content, the symphony was first performed alongside his fifth symphony in the Theater an der Wien on 22 December 1808 in a four-hour concert.

Background
Beethoven was a lover of nature who spent a great deal of his time on walks in the country. He frequently left Vienna to work in rural locations. The composer said that the Sixth Symphony is "more the expression of feeling than painting", a point underlined by the title of the first movement.

The first sketches of the Pastoral Symphony appeared in 1802. It was composed simultaneously with Beethoven's more famous Fifth Symphony. Both symphonies were premiered in a long and under-rehearsed concert in the Theater an der Wien in Vienna on 22 December 1808.

Frank A. D'Accone suggested that Beethoven borrowed the programmatic ideas (a shepherd's pipe, birds singing, streams flowing, and a thunderstorm) for his five-movement narrative layout from Le Portrait musical de la Nature ou Grande Symphonie, which was composed by Justin Heinrich Knecht (1752–1817) in 1784.

Instrumentation
The symphony is scored for the following instrumentation:

Woodwinds
1 piccolo (fourth movement only)
2 flutes
2 oboes
2 clarinets in B
2 bassoons

Brass
2 horns in F and B
2 trumpets in C and E (third, fourth, and fifth movements only)
2 trombones (alto and tenor, fourth and fifth movements only)

Percussion
Timpani (fourth movement only, in F and C (Tonic-dominant))

Strings
Violins I, II
Violas
Cellos
Double basses

Form

The symphony has five, rather than the four movements typical of symphonies preceding Beethoven's time, although there are no pauses between the last three movements. Beethoven wrote a programmatic title at the beginning of each movement:

{| class="wikitable"
!
!German title
!English translation
!Tempo marking
!Key
|-
|I. 
|Erwachen heiterer Empfindungen bei der Ankunft auf dem Lande
|Awakening of cheerful feelings on arrival in the countryside
|Allegro ma non troppo
|style="white-space: nowrap;" |F major
|-
|II.
|Szene am Bach
|Scene by the brook
|Andante molto mosso
|style="white-space: nowrap;" |B major
|-
|III.
|Lustiges Zusammensein der Landleute
|Merry gathering of country folk
|Allegro
|style="white-space: nowrap;" |F major
|-
|IV.
|Gewitter, Sturm
|Thunder, Storm
|Allegro
|style="white-space: nowrap;" |F minor
|-
|V.
|Hirtengesang. Frohe und dankbare Gefühle nach dem Sturm
|Shepherd's song. Cheerful and thankful feelings after the storm
|Allegretto
|style="white-space: nowrap;" |F major
|}
The third movement ends on an unresolved cadence that leads straight into the fourth. A performance of the work lasts about 40 minutes.

I. Allegro ma non troppo

The symphony begins with a placid and cheerful movement depicting the composer's feelings as he arrives in the country. The movement, in  meter, is in sonata form, and its motifs are extensively developed. At several points, Beethoven builds up orchestral texture by multiple repetitions of very short motifs. Yvonne Frindle commented that "the infinite repetition of pattern in nature [is] conveyed through rhythmic cells, its immensity through sustained pure harmonies."

II. Andante molto moto 

It begins with the strings playing a motif that imitates flowing water. The cello section is divided, with just two players playing the flowing-water notes on muted instruments, and the remaining cellos playing mostly pizzicato notes together with the double basses.

Towards the end is a cadenza for woodwind instruments that imitates bird calls. Beethoven helpfully identified the bird species in the score: nightingale (flute), quail (oboe), and cuckoo (two clarinets).

III. Allegro 

The third movement is a scherzo in  time, which depicts country folk dancing and reveling. It is in F major, returning to the main key of the symphony. The movement is an altered version of the usual form for scherzi, in that the trio appears twice rather than just once, and the third appearance of the scherzo theme is truncated. Perhaps to accommodate this rather spacious arrangement, Beethoven did not mark the usual internal repeats of the scherzo and the trio. Theodor Adorno identifies this scherzo as the model for the scherzos by Anton Bruckner.

The final return of the theme conveys a riotous atmosphere with a faster tempo. The movement ends abruptly, leading without a pause into the fourth movement.

IV. Allegro 

The fourth movement, in F minor and  time, is the part where Beethoven calls for the largest instrumentation in the entire piece. It depicts a violent thunderstorm with painstaking realism, building from distant thunder (quiet tremolos on cellos and basses) and a few drops of rain (eighth-note passages on the violins) to a great climax with loud thunder (timpani), lightning (piccolo), high winds (swirling arpeggio-like passages on the strings), and heavy downpours of rain (16-note tremolo passages on the strings). With the addition of the trombones later in the movement, Beethoven makes an even more tremendous effect. The storm eventually passes, with an occasional peal of thunder still heard in the distance. An ascending scale passage on the solo flute represents a rainbow. There is a seamless transition into the final movement. This movement parallels Mozart's procedure in his String Quintet in G minor K. 516 of 1787, which likewise prefaces a serene final movement with a long, emotionally stormy introduction.

V. Allegretto 
The finale, which is in F major, is in  time. The movement is in sonata rondo form, in an Intro-[A-B-A]-C-[A-B-A]-Coda structure. Like many finales, this movement emphasizes a symmetrical eight-bar theme, in this case representing the shepherds' song of thanksgiving.

The final A section starts quietly and gradually builds to an ecstatic culmination for the full orchestra (minus piccolo and timpani) with the first violins playing very rapid triplet tremolo on a high F. There follows a fervent coda suggestive of prayer, marked by Beethoven pianissimo, sotto voce; most conductors slow the tempo for this passage. After a brief period of afterglow, the work ends with two emphatic F-major chords.

In popular culture
 The symphony was used in the 1940 Disney animated film Fantasia, albeit with alterations and mythology in the length of the piece made by conductor Leopold Stokowski.

Notes

References

Antony Hopkins, The Nine Symphonies of Beethoven (Scolar Press, 1981).
David Wyn Jones, Beethoven: Pastoral Symphony (Cambridge University Press, 1995).
Charles Rosen, The Classical Style (2nd edition 1997, W.W. Norton & Company, New York).
Sixth and Seventh Symphonies (Dover Publications, Inc., 1976).

Further reading
Frogley, Alain (1995). "Beethoven's Struggle for Simplicity in the Sketches for the Third Movement of the Pastoral." Beethoven Forum, vol. 4, no. 1, pp. 99–134. 
 
 
 
 
Lorenz, Christoph L. (1985). "Beethovens Skizzen zur 'Pastoralen.'" Die Musikforschung, vol. 38, no. 2, pp. 95–108. 
Russell, Tilden (Spring 2003). "Unification in the Sixth Symphony: The Pastoral Mode." Beethoven Forum, vol. 10, no. 1, pp. 1–17. 
Will, Richard (Fall 2002). "The Nature of the Pastoral Symphony." Beethoven Forum, vol. 9, no. 2, pp. 205–215.

External links

Interview with Christoph Eschenbach

1808 compositions
06
Compositions in F major